Tyrick Kwon Mitchell (born 1 September 1999) is an English professional footballer who plays as a left back for  club Crystal Palace and the England national team.

Mitchell is a product of the Brentford and Crystal Palace academies. He made his first-team debut for the latter in July 2020, becoming a regular in the team over the following season.

Early life 
Mitchell was born in Brent, London and raised nearby in Harrow, attending Hatch End High School. He began playing for grassroots team Pinner Albion and trialled with Watford aged nine. His father spent the majority of his childhood in prison and his mother was reliant on benefits to support their family, meaning Mitchell struggled with attendance. He subsequently joined AFC Wembley where coach Abdi Farah became his mentor and, later, his agent. Mitchell described Farah as a "role model" who would take him to and from training sessions. He eventually impressed Brentford scouts in a friendly match against the academy side.

Career

Brentford 
In 2012, Mitchell joined the Brentford Academy. He was part of the under-15 team that won the Junior Globe at the 2014 Milk Cup and later offered a scholarship with the Championship club. However, the academy was shut down due to financial decisions in May 2016 and Mitchell pursued alternative options. He had a preference to remain in London to support his family.

Crystal Palace 
In July 2016, Mitchell joined Premier League club Crystal Palace. After a season with the development squad, he was awarded a two-year scholarship and featured for both the under-18 and under-23 Professional Development League winning teams. In 2018, he became a regular starter for the under-23s and was rewarded with a new contract in January 2019.

2019–20 season 
In 2019, Mitchell joined the first team on their pre-season tour and sustained a thigh injury that kept him out for five months. He returned to the first team squad as an unused substitute in a 1–1 draw with Brighton & Hove Albion on 16 December. Further issues with the injury meant he was named as an unused substitute just once more before the 2019–20 season was postponed due to the COVID-19 pandemic.

After the league's resumption in June 2020, Mitchell was named in all nine matchday squads. On 4 July, he made his professional debut as a late substitute for Patrick van Aanholt in a 3–0 defeat to Leicester City. He made his home debut with another appearance from the bench in a 2–0 defeat to Manchester United on 16 July, and started in the final two league fixtures against Wolverhampton Wanderers and Tottenham Hotspur.

2020–21 season 
Mitchell became a regular inclusion in first team manager Roy Hodgson's matchday squads during the 2020–21 season, enjoying three runs in the team as the starting left-back. He started in the first six league matches before suffering an injury, and featured another seven times between December and February. In April 2021, Mitchell signed a new four-year contract after attracting interest from Arsenal. He returned to the starting left-back role in May for the final six games of the season. On 16 May, he scored his first goal and recorded his first assist in a 3–2 victory against Aston Villa.

International career
Born in England, Mitchell is of Jamaican descent and has expressed an interest in representing the Jamaica national team. He received his first senior England call up on 21 March 2022, following withdrawals by Trent Alexander-Arnold and Reece James.

He made his senior debut under manager Gareth Southgate in a 2–1 win over Switzerland on 26 March 2022, as a 61st-minute like-for-like substitute for Luke Shaw.

Career statistics

Club

International

References

External links

Tyrick Mitchell at cpfc.co.uk

Living people
1999 births
Footballers from the London Borough of Brent
English footballers
English sportspeople of Jamaican descent
Premier League players
Black British sportspeople
Association football fullbacks
Crystal Palace F.C. players
England international footballers